Prince had many musical associates (band members, collaborators, and protegees) during his career.

 
Prince played keyboards in the studio for Stevie Nicks' song, "Stand Back".

Associated bands & side projects

 94 East
 The Time
 Vanity 6
 Apollonia 6
 The Revolution
 Wendy & Lisa
 The Family
 Madhouse
 The New Power Generation
 3rdeyegirl

Notes

Prince (musician)